Wallace W. Johnson (December 30, 1842 – December 30, 1911) was a soldier from Pennsylvania who fought in the American Civil War. He received the United States' highest medal for bravery during combat, the Medal of Honor, for his actions during the Battle of Gettysburg 2 July 1863. He was issued the medal on 8 August 1900.

Biography
Johnson was born December 30, 1842, in Newfield, New York, and when the American Civil War broke out he enlisted into Company G, 6th Pennsylvania Reserves (also known as the 35th Pennsylvania Infantry) at Waverly, New York.

On the second day of fighting in the Battle of Gettysburg Union forces had been forced to fall back due to the superior numbers of the opposing Confederate force. As more Union troops arrived to fight however the battle started to shift. In an area known as Devil's Den, Johnson, along with J. Levi Roush, John W. Hart, George Mears, Chester S. Furman and Thaddeus S. Smith volunteered to attack a small log cabin being held by Confederate forces. Although they attempted to approach the cabin by stealth, they were spotted and began taking fire from the enemy force locked inside. Johnson and the other men rushed through the enemy fire and forced their way into the cabin. Before they could start shooting the confederate soldiers surrendered and were taken back to Union lines as prisoners. For their actions during this incident, all six men received the Medal of Honor.

Johnson was mustered out of the military June 11, 1864, in Harrisburg, Pennsylvania. After the war Johnson returned to Pennsylvania and died December 30, 1911, in Berks County, Pennsylvania. He is buried at West Laurel Hill Cemetery in Bala Cynwyd, Pennsylvania.

Medal of Honor citation

See also
 List of American Civil War Medal of Honor recipients: G–L
 List of Medal of Honor recipients for the Battle of Gettysburg

References

External links
 Victoria Cross Online
 Medal of Honor website

1842 births
1911 deaths
American Civil War recipients of the Medal of Honor
People from Tompkins County, New York
Military personnel from New York (state)
Burials at West Laurel Hill Cemetery